Mayview is an unincorporated community in Garfield County, in the U.S. state of Washington.

History
Mayview was founded in 1880. A post office called May View was established in 1879, and remained in operation until 1959.

References

Unincorporated communities in Garfield County, Washington
Unincorporated communities in Washington (state)